Kärra KIF (also known as Kärra/Klareberg IF) is a Swedish football club located in Hisings Kärra, Göteborg.

Background
Kärra KIF currently plays in Division 4 Göteborg B which is the sixth tier of Swedish football. They play their home matches at the Klarebergsvallen in Hisings Kärra.

The club is affiliated to Göteborgs Fotbollförbund. Kärra IF have competed in the Svenska Cupen on 5 occasions and have played 7 matches in the competition.

Season to season

Footnotes

External links
 Kärra KIF – Official website
 Kärra KIF on Facebook

Football clubs in Gothenburg
Hisingen
Football clubs in Västra Götaland County